The Red Hook Society for the Apprehension and Detention of Horse Thieves is the oldest horse thief apprehension society in the United States.

The society was formed at the Upper Red Hook Inn of Stephen Holmes on October 10, 1796. On October 28, 1796, the first notices were posted in the area of Red Hook, New York, warning would-be horse thieves that the society had been formed to stop them.

Members are known as "riders" and must pay a $5 annual membership fee. Prior to 1956, only men were allowed as members.

The annual meeting of the society takes place on the first Tuesday in October. Each year it features a horse-related speaker and offers a $500 scholarship to a student who wishes to study "an equine field." As of 2021, the organization had 106 members. In 2003, it had a membership of 63 and the president, Woody Klose, had served for 21 years.

There is no record of the society ever actually catching a horse thief. By 1990, the organization had decided that catching and arresting horse thieves was an activity best left to professionals. In early days, however, the further a rider rode in search of a missing horse, the more he was paid. They were also paid a bonus if they left the county.

When they discovered that the Society in Dedham for Apprehending Horse Thieves was claiming to be the oldest such society in the nation, they sent a letter demanding the Massachusetts group cease and desist making such a claim. A member from the Society in Dedham then attended the Red Hook Society's 225th annual meeting to concede the point.

See also
Bentonville Anti-Horse Thief Society

References

Organizations established in 1796
Red Hook, New York
Anti-horse theft societies